Joseph Ehrenkranz (May 7, 1926 – February 23, 2014) was an American Orthodox rabbi.

Life and career
Ehrenkranz was born in Newark, New Jersey on May 7, 1926. He received his ordination at Yeshiva University in 1949. Ehrenkranz was the rabbi emeritus of Congregation Agudath Sholom in Stamford, Connecticut, where, from 1948 until 1992, he served as the congregation's spiritual leader and built it into a large, influential, and dynamic Orthodox community.

From 1992 until his retirement in July 2007, he was the executive director of the Center for Christian-Jewish Understanding at Sacred Heart University in Fairfield, Connecticut, of which he was one of the co-founders. He was replaced by Rabbi Eugene Korn. He is known for the prominent role which he has played in Jewish-Catholic dialogue.

Ehrenkranz was the Synagogue Council of America's representative to the United Nations.

On October 14, 2010, he was presented with CCJU's Nostra Aetate Award for "his outstanding contributions to a world at peace". In 2011, he made Aliyah to Israel.

Personal life and death
Ehrenkranz was a cousin by marriage and close advisor to politician Joe Lieberman, and his work was praised by Pope John Paul II. Among his grandchildren is the actor Raviv Ullman.

Ehrenkranz died on February 23, 2014, at the age of 87.<ref name="obit">

Publications
 Interfaith Dialogue: The Theory and the Practice (with Rabbi Eugene Korn)
 Religion, Woman and Family

Sources
 "Congregation Agudath Sholom, Orthodox", The American Synagogue (Greenwood Publishing Group)

References

1926 births
2014 deaths
20th-century American rabbis
21st-century American rabbis
American Modern Orthodox rabbis
Sacred Heart University faculty
Yeshiva University alumni
Jewish American writers